Glenea didyma is a species of beetle in the family Cerambycidae. It was described by Per Olof Christopher Aurivillius in 1903 and is known from Java.

References

didyma
Beetles described in 1903